The Organization of Turkic States (OTS), formerly called the Turkic Council or the Cooperation Council of Turkic Speaking States, is an intergovernmental organization comprising prominent independent Turkic countries: Azerbaijan, Kazakhstan, Kyrgyzstan, Turkey and Uzbekistan. It is an intergovernmental organization whose overarching aim is promoting comprehensive cooperation among Turkic-speaking states. First proposed by Kazakh President Nursultan Nazarbayev in 2006, it was founded on 3 October 2009, in Nakhchivan. The General Secretariat is in Istanbul. 

Hungary, Northern Cyprus and Turkmenistan are the observer states.

During the 8th summit in Istanbul in 2021, the council reformed into an organization, with the name Turkic Council being changed to Organization of Turkic States.

History 
The organization was established on 3 October 2009 as the Cooperation Council of the Turkic Speaking States (Turkic Council), by the Nakhchivan Agreement signed among Azerbaijan, Kazakhstan, Kyrgyzstan, and Turkey. According to Halil Akıncı, the founding Secretary-General of the organization, the Turkic Council became the first voluntary alliance of Turkic states in history.

In 2012, the flag of the Turkic Council was adopted at its 2nd Summit, which took place in Bishkek on 23 August 2012 and officially raised on 12 October 2012. The flag combines the symbols of the four founding member states: the light blue color of the flag of Kazakhstan which also evokes the traditional Turkic color of turquoise, the sun of the flag of Kyrgyzstan, the star of the flag of Azerbaijan and the crescent of the Turkish flag.

On 30 April 2018, it was announced that Uzbekistan would join the Cooperation Council of Turkic-Speaking States and attend the upcoming summit of the organisation in Bishkek. It formally applied for membership on 12 September 2019.

Since late 2018, Hungary has been an observer and may request full membership. Turkmenistan received the observer status in 2021.

In November 2021, the organization was renamed the Organization of Turkic States. 

Of great importance is the comprehensive structure of the Union of Municipalities of the Turkic World, in which local governments from 30 countries and regions are represented. June 10, 2022 6th Congress of the Union of Municipalities of the Turkic World.

In 2022, the Turkish Republic of Northern Cyprus was admitted to the organisation as observer member.

Purpose

Nominally, the Preamble of the Nakhchivan Agreement reaffirms the will of Member States to adhere to the purposes and principles enshrined in the Charter of the United Nations, and defines the main objective of the Organization of Turkic States as further deepening comprehensive cooperation among Turkic Speaking States, as well as making joint contributions to peace and stability in the region and in the world. Member States have nominally confirmed their commitment to democratic values, human rights, the rule of law, and principles of good governance.

The Nakhchivan Agreement sets out the main purposes and tasks of the Organization as follows:
Strengthening mutual confidence and friendship among the Parties;
Developing common positions on foreign policy issues;
Coordinating actions to combat international terrorism, separatism, extremism and cross-border crimes;
Promoting effective regional and bilateral cooperation in all areas of common interest;
Creating favorable conditions for trade and investment;
Aiming for comprehensive and balanced economic growth, social and cultural development;
Expanding interaction in the fields of science, technology, education, health, culture, sports and tourism;
Encouraging interaction of mass media and other means of communication;
Strengthening cooperation and integration between member states;
Promoting exchange of relevant legal information and enhancing legal cooperation.

Structure and operation
Main organs of the Organization of Turkic States include:
Council of Heads of State
Council of Foreign Ministers
Senior Officials Committee
Council of Elders (Aksakals)
The Secretariat
The main decision-making and governing body of the Organization of Turkic States is the Council of Heads of State, which is presided over by the President whose country holds the chairmanship. The chairmanship rotates on an annual basis. All activities of the Organization of Turkic States are coordinated and monitored by its Secretariat, which is located in Istanbul in accordance with the Nakhchivan Agreement. Presidents meet once a year in a previously determined Turkic city. Senior officials, Aksakals, as well as other Ministers and government officials, all meet on a regular basis.

Affiliated bodies and organizations

OTS functions as an umbrella for organization like:
 the Parliamentary Assembly of Turkic States (TURKPA) (administrative capital in Baku)
 the International Organization of Turkic Culture (TURKSOY) (administrative capital in Ankara)
 International Turkic Academy (administrative capital in Nur-Sultan)
 Turkic Culture and Heritage Foundation (administrative capital in Baku)
 Center of Nomadic Civilizations (administrative capital in Bishkek)
 Turkic Business Council (administrative capital in Istanbul)

International cooperation
OTS is an observer at the Economic Cooperation Organization and has also applied for an observer status at the UN and the Organisation of Islamic Cooperation. Besides, OTS maintains close cooperative relations with the Organization for Security and Co-operation in Europe and the Conference on Interaction and Confidence-Building Measures in Asia.

Projects
Since its founding agreement defines comprehensive cooperation among Turkic states as the organization's main objective and raison d'être, the Organization of Turkic States is working on a variety of projects. The projects are grouped under six cooperation processes, which are: economy, culture, education, transport, customs, and diaspora. Examples of the projects include establishing the Turkic University Union and writing a common history textbook. The Organization of Turkic States also works on ways to boost economic development in underdeveloped regions of Member States. The Secretariat brings together Economy Ministers, Education Ministers, Transport Ministers, Heads of Customs Administrations, and other senior officials from different ministries and agencies in order to work on ways to promote cooperation in relevant spheres. Prior to being brought before ministers and heads of administrations, projects and issues of cooperation are elaborated by working groups. One recently launched project is the establishment of a mechanism for closer cooperation among Turkic diasporas all over the world.

Joint investment fund 
In November 2020, Kyrgyz Minister of Foreign Affairs Ruslan Kazakbaev pointed that Organization of Turkic States members have to strengthen their economic relations, they have to establish a joint investment fund and build its center on Kyrgyzstan on his meeting with Turkish Minister Mevlüt Çavuşoğlu. Baghdad Amreyev visited Minister of Treasury and Finance of Turkey Lütfi Elvan and sides talked about establishment of Joint Investment Fund. In September 2021, on meeting of Turkic ministers responsible for the economy, sides negotiated about a Turkic Joint Investment Fund feasibility work and agreement to establish the fund.

Common Alphabet 
In September 2022, on the occasion of the 90th anniversary of the Language Festival, the Organization of Turkic States decided to establish a "Common Alphabet Commission" within the body of OTS for a unified alphabet of the Turkic world. During the event, scientists from the Turkic states gave information about the alphabets and historical processes used in their own countries, and thus it was emphasized that the transition processes to the common alphabet should be accelerated, and the application should be widespread. The commission, which will hold its first meeting in Kyrgyzstan, will observe the work of the common alphabet and report to the Council of Elders.

Summits

Following the dissolution of the Soviet Union, the newly independent Turkic States of Azerbaijan, Kazakhstan, Kyrgyzstan, Turkmenistan and Uzbekistan as well as Turkey organized Summits of the Heads of Turkic Speaking States, the first of which took place in 1992 in Ankara. With the establishment of Turkic Council, at the 10th Summit it was decided to rename the top-level meetings to Turkic Council Summits.

Turkic Council Summit is the highlight of the year whereby Heads of State evaluate outcomes of the past period and set goals for the next year. The First Summit took place in Almaty, Kazakhstan, on 20–21 October 2011 and focused primarily on economic cooperation. The Second Summit was held in Bishkek, Kyrgyzstan, on 22–23 August 2012 and concentrated on educational, scientific, and cultural cooperation. The Third Summit took place on 15–16 August 2013 in Qabala, Azerbaijan with a theme of transport and connectivity.

On 15 October 2019, the Seventh Turkic Council Summit was organized in Baku with the participation of Presidents of member states Ilham Aliyev, Sooronbai Jeenbekov, Recep Tayyip Erdoğan, Shavkat Mirziyoyev, as well as Purli Agamyradov as a guest, Viktor Orban as an observer and heads of Turkic cooperation institutions. The participants celebrated the 10th anniversary of the Nakhchivan Agreement on the establishment of the Turkic Council in addition to Uzbekistan’s joining the organization as a full-fledged member. The title of Honorary Chairman of the Turkic Council was given to the former President of Kazakhstan Nursultan Nazarbayev. In the conclusion of the Summit, the Heads of States signed Baku Declaration. Besides, the presidency in the Council officially passed to Azerbaijan.

Extraordinary Summit 
The Extraordinary Summit of the Turkic Council focused on the fight against the COVID-19 pandemic was conducted through videoconferencing by the initiative of the chairman of the organization Ilham Aliyev on 10 April 2020. The conference titled "Cooperation and solidarity in the fight against the COVID-19 pandemic" was held with the participation of the Director-General of the World Health Organization, Tedros Adhanom Ghebreyesus along with the head of states of the member countries. Participants discussed the measures taken at the national level to fight against the coronavirus epidemic, to improve multilateral cooperation in the field of healthcare, and to undertake the common challenges caused by the outbreak of COVID-19. Exchanging views on the ways of overcoming negative effects of coronavirus on the national and global economies, they touched upon trade relations and continuous transportation and they entrusted the Ministries of Commerce and Transport of the member States with reviewing the process via videoconferencing and with presenting practical solutions for the free flow of goods among Turkic Council states across the Trans-Caspian Corridor. An 18-point list of mutual priorities of all member nations was outlined in the Baku Declaration.

Members

Current

Observer states

Possible future members and observers 
In 2020, Ukrainian Deputy Foreign Minister Emine Ceppar stated Ukraine wanted to be an observer.

Turkish Minister of Foreign Affairs Mevlüt Çavuşoğlu announced that Turkmenistan, currently an observer state, could become a full member during the 2022 Organization of Turkic States summit.

Former applicants 
On 3 May 2021, the Islamic Republic of Afghanistan officially applied for observer status. But with the Taliban overthrowing the Islamic Republic of Afghanistan with its Islamic Emirate of Afghanistan in August that year, the status of its application for observer status is uncertain.

Events

List of Secretaries-General

List of chairmen 
According to article 8 of the Nakhchivan Agreement, the state that hosts the regular summit, will assume the chairmanship until next meeting.

See also
Azerbaijan–Organization of Turkic States relations
List of Turkic dynasties and countries
List of international organizations based in Istanbul
World Turks Qurultai

References

External links

 
 Text of  Nakhchivan Agreement

 
2009 establishments in Asia
2009 establishments in Europe
International organizations based in Asia
International organizations based in Europe
International political organizations
Organizations established in 2009
Political organizations based in Asia
Political organizations based in Europe
Political systems
Supranational unions